Davidson de Oliveira Morais is a professional Brazilian footballer. He previously played in Greek football for Messiniakos FC, Apollon Kalamarias and OFI Crete, and following an unsuccessful trial for German side Alemannia Aachen in July 2006, he signed a three-year contract with Dnipro. After one year in Figueirense,  Morais agreed to a contract with the Cypriot outfit AC Omonia. On 7 December 2011 he released on a free by Omonoia.

Honours
Omonia
Cypriot Championship: 2010
Cypriot Cup: 2011
Cyprus FA Shield: 2010

References

External links

Davidson's profile at Dnipro's official web page
Davidson Morais profile at the Brazilian FA database

1981 births
Living people
Brazilian footballers
Brazilian expatriate footballers
Esporte Clube Taubaté players
OFI Crete F.C. players
FC Dnipro players
Apollon Pontou FC players
Figueirense FC players
AC Omonia players
Ukrainian Premier League players
Super League Greece players
Cypriot First Division players
Expatriate footballers in Greece
Expatriate footballers in Cyprus
Expatriate footballers in Ukraine
Brazilian expatriate sportspeople in Ukraine
Association football fullbacks
Footballers from Belo Horizonte